Nikolaos Margioris (Greek: Νικόλαος Μαργιωρής; 1913–1993) was a Greek esoteric philosopher, and author. He taught for many decades various metaphysical and philosophical subjects. He wrote also many practical and philosophical books.

Biography 
Nikolaos Margioris was born in the island of Samos on 15 December 1913.  He moved to Alexandria, Egypt at a very young age. He fought in World War Two and in the Greek Civil War. He fought in World War II as a reserve officer, where he was seriously injured in El Alamein and in Rimini. For his services to the country he was honored with many medals (it is worth mentioning the Grand Cross) as well as with the veteran’s disability pension. Later, he was in Tibet and India for his training for almost one decade. He returned in Alexandria afterwards, where he started teaching to sophisticated people of the region. He left Egypt in 1958 with his family, and moved to Athens, Greece.
He created many philosophical schools called Omakoio (Ομακοείο), in many different Greek cities.

He wrote 33 books.

He died on 6 May 1993.

Nikolaos Margioris belongs also to the 100 Great Greeks as he greatly contributed to the formation, presentation and popularization of current Greek metaphysical philosophy based on the comparative analysis of the most popular international philosophical views in this area with the corresponding Greek views.

Nikolaos Margioris was a uniquely gifted modern esoteric experiential personality, of multiple talents and of unprecedented dynamism and productivity, who noiselessly passed the threshold of his country, delivered the quintessence of integrated spiritual experiences that summarizes the interaction of a metaphysical worldview in the oriental cultures and the ancient Greek, Hellenistic and Christian Orthodox view of life and death.

He had a son, and a daughter. His son is Andrew Margioris, a Greek endocrinologist and former Chief Editor of the Hormones Endocrine journal.

Metaphysical philosophy 
Nikolaos Margioris considered metaphysics as the only truth, believing that it is possible for the man to realize the truth.

In his writings he deals with issues such as arithmosofia, considered pseudomathematics or pseudoscience by scientists.

Books such as Dravidians, the Pre-hellenic Greeks belong to the movement of Neopythagoreanism. He describes myths as reality, like the war of the Atlanteans against Dravidians, which he places chronologically around 16,000 years BC, a time where is no documentation.

Work 
After 23 years of metaphysical publications (1970–1993), he wrote 33 books of clearly Esoteric subject-matter, with an incredible and unprecedented metaphysical analysis which led to increasing popularity for those who know the subject. He also wrote multiple essays on various Esoteric matters. He circulated the metaphysical journal OMAKOIO. He created a field of studies through correspondence courses under the name Esoteric Key. In this field, the students received instruction characterized by a deep, theoretical and practical Esoteric analysis, in many different courses.

Every three months, he held seminars in Shiatsu lasting for many days in which he himself not only taught Shiatsu but a lot of other Esoteric therapeutic systems among which were also his own discoveries.

Apart from teaching therapeutic systems, he himself applied therapies. Also, his students who had been instructed in these techniques applied these therapies. Meanwhile, a school of Kriya Yoga was established, bringin Kriya Yoga in Greece for the first time.

He himself taught the pure and complete Raja Yoga, as well as many other yoga systems like  Mantram, Karma, Gnani-a, Bakti-a, Kundalini.

He also started teaching in Greece the mysticism of Christianity, and the Christocentral mysticism.

All his lectures and didactic activities took place in his seat, in his Spiritual Laboratory, which, from its establishment in 1976, he called the Omakoio of Athens in memory of the Omakoio which Pythagoras first established in Croton of South Italy.

In 1972, he established the Association The Pious Pilgrims, where he tirelessly held free lectures on various Esoteric subjects.

Bibliography 
 (2000) Η πυθαγόρεια αριθμοσοφία
 (2000) Κρίγια Γιόγκα
 (1999) Τα Ελευσίνια μυστήρια
 (1998) Αποκρυφολογία
 (1997) Στις μέρες του μεγάλου βασιλιά της Κρήτης Μίνωα
 (1997) Το μυστικό της Χάθα-Γιόγκα
 (1996) Δραβίδες οι πρόγονοι των Ελλήνων
 (1996) Θεραπευτική με δίχως φάρμακα, χειροπλαστική
 (1996) Κάρμα
 (1994) Η άλλη όψη του δόγματος του Έριχ φον Νταίνικεν
 (1994) Η μυστική διδασκαλία
 (1993) Η μυστική διδασκαλία
 (1993) Θεραπευτική με δίχως φάρμακα
 (1993) Μεταθανάτια ζωή
 (1992) Αποκρυφολογία
 (1992) Λευκή μαγεία
 (1991) Αποκρυφολογία
 (1991) Η μυστική διδασκαλία
 (1991) Μυστικισμός
 (1991) Οι Φαραώ Ακενατόν και Τουταγχαμών
 (1990) Γένεση και θάνατος των κόσμων
 (1990) Θεραπευτική με δίχως φάρμακα
 (1990) Μέθοδος ψυχοθεραπευτική με δίχως φάρμακα
 (1990) Μετενσάρκωση
 (1989) Κάρμα
 (1989) Τριδιάστατος και τετραδιάστατος ορατός και αόρατος κόσμος
 (1989) Τρισδιάστατος και τετρασδιάστατος κόσμος
 (1988) Αποσυμβολισμός της ελληνικής μυθολογίας
 (1988) Η τελευταία μέρα του Σωκράτη
 (1987) Η θεουργία διδάσκει τον αιώνιο δρόμο της ψυχής
 (1987) Πατάπιος
 (1987) Φως εις το σκότος
 (1985) Δίτομη μεταφυσική εγκυκλοπαίδεια
 (1985) Δίτομη μεταφυσική εγκυκλοπαίδεια
 (1983) Ράτζα γιόγκα
 (1980) Ξυπόλητοι χορεύουν πάνω στη φωτιά
 (1979) Dravidians, the Pre-hellenic Greeks

References 

1913 births
1993 deaths
20th-century Greek philosophers
Greek expatriates in Egypt
Writers from Alexandria
People from Alexandria
Greek military personnel of World War II
People from Samos